The 2022  PBA Tour season, the 63rd season of play for the U.S. Professional Bowlers Association's ten-pin bowling tour, begins on January 15 with the Regional Portions of the PBA Players Championship. The season included 16 title events (14 singles, two doubles), three special non-title events, and the PBA League team event.

On January 5, 2022, the PBA announced that CEO Colie Edison resigned, having accepted the position of Chief Growth Officer for the WNBA. A successor to Edison has yet to be named.

Season overview 
The PBA opened the 2022 season, as it did in 2021, with the expanded PBA Players Championship. Five Regional events (East, South, Midwest, Southwest and West) were hosted first, with each Region holding a televised stepladder final round on FS1. The five Regional winners then competed in the tournament finals held in Euless, Texas on January 29.

The Tour's other four major championships (U.S. Open, Tournament of Champions, PBA World Championship and USBC Masters) are all contested within the first 13 events of the season. The PBA League team competition returns in July, after a one-year hiatus. All five majors and the PBA Tour Playoffs offer a $100,000 top prize, marking the first time in PBA history that six events have paid out a six-figure first place check.

The season currently has 36 broadcasts scheduled, including 25 on FS1, four on Fox, two on CBS Sports Network and five on the FloBowling web channel. Fox is scheduled to broadcast the stepladder finals of three major tournaments (Tournament of Champions, PBA World Championship and USBC Masters), plus the final round of the PBA Tour Playoffs.

On November 17, 2021, the PBA announced that Pabst Blue Ribbon will be a title sponsor as “official beer” for the 2022 PBA Tour. During the season (except for the Collegiate Invitational where regulations on alcohol advertising are in effect as many players are under 21 years of age and for amateurism regulations, as men's bowling is governed by the USBC, not the NCAA), Fox Sports broadcasts will feature a “PBR 6-Pack Alert” whenever a bowler achieves five strikes in a row. If the bowler gets the sixth consecutive strike following the alert, he will win a $1,000 bonus. If the sixth strike is not achieved, $500 is added to the jackpot for when the next 6-Pack Alert comes around, and Pabst will continue adding $500 each time the alert appears and the sixth strike is not achieved.

Storm Bowling sponsors four events in the 2022 season that make up the Storm Cup series: David Small's Best of the Best Championship (Feb. 7–9), David Small's PBA Kokomo Championship (Feb. 14–16), Lubbock Sports Open (Mar. 18–20) and Colorado Springs Open (Mar. 22–24). Each event awards a PBA title, $20,000 top prize, and Tier 3 Tour points. The top five players in points over the four events will share in a $25,000 bonus pool, with $10,000 going to the player (Jason Belmonte) with the most points. All four events are live-streamed exclusively on the FloBowling Web channel.

The PBA League returns July 6–10 after a one-year hiatus, and features ten teams. In a change from previous events, each player on a team bowls a full game in the division qualifying round. Teams are seeded for the division stepladder based on total team scores, and the six highest-scoring bowlers from each division are awarded spots in the Strike Derby, which takes place in the same location. The division stepladders and Elias Cup Finals will still use the traditional Baker game format.

Season awards 
End-of-season awards announced on November 2–4, 2022:

 Chris Schenkel PBA Player of the Year: Jason Belmonte
 Harry Smith PBA Points Leader Award: Jason Belmonte
 Harry Golden PBA Rookie of the Year: Santtu Tahvanainen
George Young High Average Award: E. J. Tackett
 PBA Steve Nagy Sportsmanship Award: Jake Peters
 PBA Tony Reyes Community Service Award: Ryan Shafer

Tournament summary 
The events for the 2022 PBA tournament schedule are shown below. Major tournaments are in bold. Career PBA title numbers for winners are shown in parenthesis (#). Winner's share prize money is shown in US dollars ($), except where indicated.

Tour points are awarded for most events. Besides the season-ending Harry Smith PBA Points Winner award, points are one consideration for Player of the Year voting, and also affect eligibility for the PBA Tour Playoffs, PBA Tour Finals (combined with 2021 points), and the 2023 DHC PBA Japan Invitational. Points for tournaments are awarded differently based on a "tier" system. The tier of each qualifying tournament is shown in the Notes column on the tournament schedule, and is explained below.

 Tier 3: PBA short format or limited field tournaments (2500 points for first, and descending thereafter)
 Tier 2: PBA standard tournaments with a fully open field (double the points of Tier 3 events)
 Tier 1: PBA major tournaments (triple the points of Tier 3 events)

References

External links 
Season Schedule

Professional Bowlers Association seasons
2022 in bowling